Minnesota State Highway 113 (MN 113) is a  highway in northwest Minnesota, which runs from its intersection with State Highway 32 in Syre and continues east to its eastern terminus at its intersection with U.S. Highway 71 in Clover Township (17 miles north of the city of Park Rapids).

Route description
Highway 113 serves as an east–west route in northwest Minnesota between Syre, the White Earth Indian Reservation, Waubun, and Clover Township.

The route intersects U.S. Highway 59 in Waubun.

The route passes through Clearwater County briefly twice in southern La Prairie Township.

The route passes through the White Earth State Forest in southeast Mahnomen County and northeast Becker County.

Highway 113 parallels State Highway 34 and State Highway 200 throughout its route.

The western terminus of Highway 113 is located in the Red River Valley region of Minnesota.

The eastern terminus of the route is located immediately south of Lake Itasca.

Highway 113 serves as the southern border for Itasca State Park. The two park entrances are located on nearby Highways 71 (east entrance) and 200 (north entrance).

The route is legally defined as Routes 200 and 283 in the Minnesota Statutes. It is not marked with these numbers.

History
The section of Highway 113 between U.S. 59 at Waubun and U.S. 71 at Clover Township was authorized on April 22, 1933.

The section of the route between U.S. 59 at Waubun and State Highway 32 at Syre was authorized in 1949.

Only a small portion of the route, east of Waubun, had been paved by 1953.  The entire route was paved by the late 1960s.

Major intersections

References

113
Transportation in Norman County, Minnesota
Transportation in Mahnomen County, Minnesota
Transportation in Becker County, Minnesota
Transportation in Clearwater County, Minnesota
Transportation in Hubbard County, Minnesota